Ana Beatriz Martínez Solórzano (born 14 May 1945), known professionally as Ana Martín, is a Mexican actress and model. She is one of the last surviving stars from the Golden Age of Mexican cinema.

She won the Miss Mexico title in 1963, which took her to compete in Miss World 1963 in London, where she was disqualified for being underage. Since 1965 she has appeared in numerous telenovelas and films.

Early life and career
Born Ana Beatriz Martínez Solórzano to famous comedian Jesús Martínez 'Palillo', and his Nicaraguan wife, Hilda Solórzano, Ana Martín became known to the public in the first half of the 1960s after winning the title of Miss Mexico and starring in popular movies alongside some of the biggest young actors of the time, including César Costa and Fernando Luján, as well as American stars Robert Taylor and Chad Everett (in Return of the Gunfighter).

After playing supporting roles in various telenovelas, Martín won her first leading role as Laura in Muchacha de barrio in 1979. That same year, she played the leading role in La llama de tu amor.

In 1982, she starred in the successful Gabriel y Gabriela, in which she played a young woman trying to pass as a man. She also sang the theme song and released an album. Martín stated in an interview for the TV program Vidas Paralelas in 2010 that she was not a singer and has never recorded any album. She said that the song in this telenovela was done by special effects.

After La pasión de Isabela in 1984 and El pecado de Oyuki in 1986, Martín largely retired from the public view. In 1996, she made a welcome return to the small screen and has remained very active, with credits in telenovelas such as Alma Rebelde, Amor Real, Rubí, La Madrastra, Duelo de Pasiones, Un gancho al corazon, Mañana es para siempre, Soy Tu Dueña with La que no podia amar and currently taping in Amores verdaderos. In 2009 he made a small appearance in Los exitosos Pérez alongside Jaime Camil, Ludwika Paleta, Rogelio Guerra, Verónica Castro and José Ron.

Album
 1982: Ana Martín

Filmography

Awards and nominations

Premios TVyNovelas

References

External links
 

Living people
Mexican telenovela actresses
Mexican television actresses
Mexican film actresses
Mexican stage actresses
Mexican women singers
Mexican female models
Mexican telenovela producers
Miss World 1963 delegates
20th-century Mexican actresses
21st-century Mexican actresses
Actresses from Mexico City
Singers from Mexico City
Mexican people of Nicaraguan descent
People from Mexico City
1945 births
Women television producers